Udston Hospital is a health facility in Farm Road, Hamilton, South Lanarkshire, Scotland. It is managed by NHS Lanarkshire.

History
The hospital was created by converting a 19th-century mansion built for Lewis Potter, a director of the City of Glasgow Bank, into an infectious diseases hospital in May 1919. It was expanded in 1930 and, after joining the National Health Service in 1948, it was expanded again in the late 1990s when a large modern extension was built on the site. One of the wards used for elderly patients who were awaiting transfer to a nursing home or a package of homecare, known as Douglas Ward, was closed in 2018.

References

1919 establishments in Scotland
Hospitals established in 1919
NHS Scotland hospitals
Hospitals in South Lanarkshire
NHS Lanarkshire
Buildings and structures in Hamilton, South Lanarkshire